Freddy Alexander Cachazo is a Venezuelan-born theoretical physicist who holds the Gluskin Sheff Freeman Dyson Chair in Theoretical Physics at the Perimeter Institute for Theoretical Physics in Waterloo, Ontario, Canada.

He is known for the contributions to quantum field theory through the study of scattering amplitudes, in particular in quantum chromodynamics, N = 4 supersymmetric Yang–Mills theory and quantum gravity. His contributions include BCFW recursion relations, the CSW vertex expansion and the amplituhedron. In 2014, Cachazo was awarded the New Horizons Prize for uncovering numerous structures underlying scattering amplitudes in gauge theories and gravity.

Academic career

After graduating from Simón Bolívar University in 1996, Cachazo attended a year-long Postgraduate Diploma Programme at the International Centre for Theoretical Physics (ICTP) in Trieste, Italy. He was admitted in Harvard University, where he completed the Ph.D. under the supervision of Cumrun Vafa in 2002.

Cachazo was a post-doctoral member of the Institute for Advanced Study (IAS) in Princeton, New Jersey in 2002-05 and 2009-10. In 2005, he became a faculty member at the Perimeter Institute for Theoretical Physics in Waterloo, Ontario, Canada, as well as an Adjoint Faculty at the nearby University of Waterloo. He currently holds the Gluskin Sheff Freeman Dyson Chair in Theoretical Physics.

Cachazo's research concerns quantum field theory, the underlying theory describing fundamental interactions of particles and space-time itself. The research program is to understand their deep structure through the study of scattering amplitudes. Such understanding allows for both efficient computation of the probabilities of physical processes occurring and insights into the unknown structures of the gauge theories and gravity.

Together with Ruth Britto, Bo Feng and Edward Witten, he introduced the recursion relations for the computation of scattering amplitudes, which opened a new window for computations required at particle accelerators, such as the Large Hadron Collider. With Nima Arkani-Hamed and collaborators, he studied N = 4 supersymmetric Yang–Mills theory and showed how to compute amplitudes at any order in the perturbation theory. He co-discovered a new formalism unifying gauge theory and gravity in any space-time dimension, known as the Cachazo-He-Yuan formulation.

Awards and honors

In 2009, he was awarded the Gribov Medal for an outstanding work by a young physicist from the European Physical Society. Two year later he won the Rutherford Medal, an equivalent prize awarded by the Royal Society of Canada. In 2012, Canadian Association of Physicists awarded Cachazo with the Herzberg Medal. Finally, he won the 2014 New Horizons Prize, which by many is regarded to be the most prestigious award for young theoretical physicists.

Selected publications

References

Living people
Harvard University alumni
21st-century Canadian physicists
Theoretical physicists
Year of birth missing (living people)